In object-oriented programming, a class implementation file is often used to contain the implementation code for the method(s) of a class. Programming languages like C and C++ make use of these implementation files so as to separate the interface and implementation of these methods.

Motivation
Using this structure, a class definition file containing the declaration of the class and its members is also created.  If the class definition has been included and the implementation file for its methods is available, the user can instantiate an object of the class.  The purpose of this structure is to keep the implementation code hidden, but allow the user to view the design. 

Users make use of the public interface of an object so as to make creating objects as simple as possible, ensuring that client code does not distract the user with unnecessary details of the class's implementation.
This allows the user the information needed to use the class effectively, but prevents him or her from damaging the compiled code.

The structure of a class implementation file
An implementation file is used in  C++ programming when creating a class definition to split the interface from the implementation. The header file would declare all the  member functions (methods) and  data methods (fields) that the class has. 

The implementation file will contain the actual definition or source code of the methods declared in the header file.  This file can start with a header block, which provides comments that describe the purpose of the defined class and any details about the creation of the actual file, such as the author of the file and date the file was created.
It can also include any libraries from the C++ Standard Library that will be used by any of the declared methods in the file. The class implementation file will usually have a line to include the associated header file (see examples below).

Example in C++
An example would be having a class called ExampleClass. The header file of this C++ file would be named "example_class.h" and the implementation file would be "example_class.cc".

An example of the structure of example_class.cc would look like this:
#include "example_class.h"

ExampleClass::ExampleClass() = default;

void ExampleClass::AddSomething(int k) {
   ...
}

In this example, the implementation for the functions has been omitted, but the functions must be declared in example_class.h like this:
#include <string>

class ExampleClass {
 public:
  ExampleClass();  // Constructor.
  void AddSomething(int k);          

 private:
  std::string name_;                      
};

Example in Objective-C
Another example of how a class implementation file would be structured can be seen with Objective-C, which is used in iOS programming.
This example will use "ExampleClass". A notable difference between C++ and Objective-C when making use of these implementation files is the extensions used at the end of the files. In C++ it will be .cpp
and in Objective-C it will be .m,
but both will use the same .h extension for their  header file(s)
as shown in the example below.

This is an example of ExampleClass.h in Objective-C:
#import <UIKit/UIKit.h>

@interface ExampleClass : NSObject {
    // instance variable declarations go here
}
- (NSString*) name;
@end

This is an example of the class's implementation file Exampleclass.m in Objective-C:
#import "ExampleClass.h"

@implementation ExampleClass
- (NSString*) name {
    return @"…";
}
@end

See also
C++ classes
Header file
Source code
C++ Standard Library
Objective-C

References

External links
 Header File and Implementation File

Class (computer programming)
Object-oriented programming languages
C++
Articles with example Objective-C code